Montana Band may refer to:

Mission Mountain Wood Band, an American musical group, formerly known as "the Montana Band"
Montana (band), an Australian musical group
Montana First Nation, an indigenous government in Canada, formerly known as "the Montana Band of Indians"

See also 
 Montana (disambiguation)
 Montanan (disambiguation)